The Truth Game is a comedy play by the British writer Ivor Novello, first staged in 1928.

Film adaptations
In 1932 Novello went to Hollywood to adapt the play for MGM as But the Flesh Is Weak. In 1941 the studio produced a remake Free and Easy.

References

Bibliography
 Goble, Alan. The Complete Index to Literary Sources in Film. Walter de Gruyter, 1999.

1928 plays
Plays by Ivor Novello
Plays set in England
British plays adapted into films
West End plays